Sarangadhara is a 1958 Indian Tamil-language film directed by V. S. Raghavan and written by S. D. Sundharam. The film stars Sivaji Ganesan and P. Bhanumathi. Based on the epic of the same name by Gurajada Apparao, it has music by G. Ramanathan and was released on 15 August 1958.

Plot

Cast 
Cast according to the opening credits:

Male
 Sivaji Ganesan as Sarangadhara
 S. V. Ranga Rao as Narendran
 M. N. Nambiar as Mahadevan
 Muthukrishnan as Sumandran
 Karunanidhi as Karunanidhi
 Sayeeram as Medhavi
 Venkatachalam as Chitrangadhan
 Harihara Bhagavathar as Rajasekhar
 Santhanam and Ezhumalai as priests
 C. V. V. Panthulu as the poet

Female
 P. Bhanumathi as Chitrangi
 P. Santha Kumari as Rathnangi
 P. Rajasulochana as Kanakangi
 Muthulakshmi as Madhavi
 Mohana as Mallika
 Chandra as Maya
Dance
 Kamala Lakshmanan
 E. V. Saroja

Production 
Sarangadhara is the third Tamil film based on the epic of the same name by Gurajada Apparao, following a 1935 film and the 1936 film Naveena Sarangadhara. The screenplay was written by S. D. Sundharam, cinematography was handled by N. C. Balakrishnan and editing by V. S. Rajan. It is Sivaji Ganesan's 50th film as an actor.

Soundtrack 
The music was composed by G. Ramanathan. Lyrics were by A. Maruthakasi. The song "Vasantha Mullai" became hugely popular was later remixed by Mani Sharma for Pokkiri (2007). The song is set in Charukesi raga.

Release and reception 
Sarangadhara was released on 15 August 1958, and distributed by Annamalai Corporation. Ananda Vikatan negatively reviewed the film, saying it was like watching a play and not an actual film.

References

External links 
 

1950s historical films
1950s Tamil-language films
1958 films
Films scored by G. Ramanathan
Hindu devotional films
Hindu mythological films
Indian historical films